John Caulfield may refer to:
 H. John Caulfield (1936–2012), American physicist
 John Caulfield (Australian footballer) (1944–2006), Australian rules footballer
John Caulfield (diplomat), American diplomat
 John Caulfield (colonist of Victoria) (1808–1879), included in The Explorers and Early Colonists of Victoria
 John Caulfield (Irish footballer) (born 1964), former Irish footballer and current manager
 Jack Caulfield (1929–2012), American security operative and law enforcement officer in the Nixon administration

See also
 John Caulfeild (1661–1707), Irish soldier and politician
 John Caulfeild (priest) (1738–1816), Anglican priest in Ireland